Changling, 1st Duke of Weiyong (Manchu:  cangling; December 18, 1758 – January 26, 1838) born in Sartuk clan, was a Qing dynasty official of Mongol descent. He began life in 1775 as a secretary of the Grand Council, after taking the Xiu cai degree at the Manchu examination. In 1787 he fought in Taiwan, and in 1792—95 against Nepaul. In 1800 he was in command of the expeditionary force sent against insurgent bands in Hubei, and subsequently in various operations undertaken from time to time against disturbances caused by the evil influence of secret societies. He became successively Governor of Anhui and Shandong, and in 1807 Viceroy of Shaan-Gan. In 1808 he was impeached on several charges and stripped of his rank, and then banished to Ili. A few months later he was once more employed, and gradually rose again to the highest posts. In 1825 he was General of Ili. In 1826, when the rebel Jahangir Khoja crossed the frontier and began his depredations, capturing Kashgar, Yangihissar, Yarkand and Khoten, he was appointed Generalissimo; and by the end of 1827 had captured Jehangir and put an end to the rebellion. The prisoner was sent to Beijing in a cage, and brained in the presence of the Daoguang Emperor, who conferred on Changling a triple-eyed peacock's feather. He was canonised as Wenxiang, and admitted into the Temple of Worthies.

References

Chinese people of Mongolian descent
Qing dynasty politicians
Manchu politicians
Mongolian Plain White Bannermen
Grand Councillors of the Qing dynasty
Grand Secretaries of the Qing dynasty
Assistant Grand Secretaries
Qing dynasty tidus
Political office-holders in Hubei
Political office-holders in Hebei
Governors of Anhui
Political office-holders in Shandong
Political office-holders in Shaanxi
Governors of Henan
Political office-holders in Yunnan
Political office-holders in Xinjiang
Viceroys of Shaan-Gan
Viceroys of Yun-Gui
1758 births
1838 deaths